Spezzano della Sila (Calabrian:  or ) is a town and comune in the province of Cosenza, in the Calabria region of southern Italy.
 
The town is bordered by Casali del Manco, Celico, Longobucco and Rovito.

References

Cities and towns in Calabria